The Boston and Sandwich Glass Company was incorporated in 1826 to hold the glass factory built a year earlier in Sandwich, Massachusetts, by Deming Jarves. The factory was closed in 1888 amid disputes with a newly formed glassmakers' labor union.

The factory was one of the earliest to produce pressed glass.

The company was an employer of Nicholas Lutz. The Sandwich Glass Museum now contains many pieces from the company.

References

Defunct glassmaking companies
American stained glass artists and manufacturers
Glassmaking companies of the United States
Sandwich, Massachusetts
Manufacturing companies established in 1826
American companies disestablished in 1888
1826 establishments in Massachusetts
1888 disestablishments in Massachusetts
American companies established in 1826